Fun with Dick and Jane may refer to 
Fun with Dick and Jane, a 1946 children's book, part of the Dick and Jane series
Fun with Dick and Jane (1977 film)
Fun with Dick and Jane (2005 film), remake of the 1977 film